Markup (or price spread) is the difference between the selling price of a good or service and cost. It is often expressed as a percentage over the cost. A markup is added into the total cost incurred by the producer of a good or service in order to cover the costs of doing business and create a profit. The total cost reflects the total amount of both fixed and variable expenses to produce and distribute a product. Markup can be expressed as a fixed amount or as a percentage of the total cost or selling price. Retail markup is commonly calculated as the difference between wholesale price and retail price, as a percentage of wholesale.  Other methods are also used.

Price determination

Profit
Assume: Sale price is 2500, Product cost is 1800
Profit = Sale price − Cost
700 = 2500 − 1800

Markup
Below shows markup as a percentage of the cost added to the cost to create a new total (i.e. cost plus).

Cost × (1 + Markup) = Sale price
or solved for Markup = (Sale price / Cost) − 1
or solved for Markup = (Sale price − Cost) / Cost

Assume the sale price is $1.99 and the cost is $1.40
Markup = ($1.99 / 1.40) − 1 = 42%
or Markup = ($1.99 − $1.40) / $1.40 = 42%

To convert from markup to profit margin:
Sale price − Cost = Sale price × Profit margin
therefore Profit Margin = (Sale price − Cost) / Sale price
Margin = 1 − (1 / (Markup + 1))
or Margin = Markup/(Markup + 1)
Margin = 1 − (1 / (1 + 0.42)) = 29.5%
or Margin = ($1.99 − $1.40) / $1.99 = 29.6%

A different method of calculating markup is based on percentage of selling price. This method eliminates the two-step process above and incorporates the ability of discount pricing.

For instance cost of an item is 75.00 with 25% markup discount.
75.00/(1 − .25) = 75.00/.75 = 100.00

Comparing the two methods for discounting:
75.00 × (1 + .25) = 93.75 sale price with a 25% discount
93.75 × (1 − .25) = 93.75 × .75 = 70.31(25) 
cost was 75.00 and if sold for 70.31 both the markup and the discount is 25%

75.00 /(1 − .25) = 100.00 sale price with a 25% discount
100.00 × (1 − .25) = 100.00 × .75 = 75.00
cost was 75.00 and if sold for 75.00 both the profit margin and the discount is 25%

These examples show the difference between adding a percentage of a number to a number and asking of what number is this number X% of. If the markup has to include more than just profit, such as overhead, it can be included as such:
cost × 1.25 = sale price

or

cost / .75 = sale price

Aggregate supply framework
P = (1+μ) W. Where μ is the markup over costs. This is the pricing equation.

W = F(u,z) Pe . This is the wage setting relation. u is unemployment which negatively affects wages and z the catch all variable positively affects wages.

Sub the wage setting into the price setting to get the aggregate supply curve.

P = Pe(1+μ) F(u,z). This is the aggregate supply curve. Where the price is determined by expected price, unemployment and z the catch all variable.

See also
Administered prices
Cost-plus pricing
Marketing
Markup rule
Pricing

References

Pricing
Profit

External links 

To calculate official website markup Markup Calculator.net